Old Crow Airport  is located in Old Crow, Yukon, Canada, and is operated by the Yukon government. The airport is extremely important to the community, which is not accessible by road.

The airport is classified as an airport of entry by Nav Canada and the Canada Border Services Agency. This airport currently can handle general aviation aircraft only, with no more than 15 passengers.

Airlines and destinations

References

External links
 Yukon Government Airports/Aerodromes

Airports in the Arctic
Certified airports in Yukon